The Mount Carmel Wolverines were an Eastern League of Professional Football team based in Mount Carmel, Pennsylvania, United States that played during the league's only year of existence, 1926. They finished fourth in the league with a 5-3-1 record (five wins, three losses and one tie).

References

Defunct American football teams in Pennsylvania
American football teams established in 1926
American football teams disestablished in 1926
1926 establishments in Pennsylvania
1926 disestablishments in Pennsylvania